This is a list of Philippine comics.

0-9
12 Kuba by Nemesio E. Caravana (author) and Ruben N. Yandoc (artist)
13 Little Fingers
13 Sugat ng Puso
24 Na Oras na Sindak
29 (Veinte Nueve)
3 Pilya
3 Sisters by Mars Ravelo (author) and P.Z. Marcelo (artist)
666 by Hal Santiago
9-Year Old Mother by Elena M. Patron/Greg Igna de Dios (authors) and Angel B. Magpali (artist)
…At Nilikha ng Diyos ang Babae by D.G. Salonga (author) and Mar T. Santana (artist)

A
Abante Action
Abante Komedi
Abaruray…Abarinding
Abel at Eden by Carlo J. Caparas (author) and Rico Rival (artist)
Abilitat sa Akong by J.M. Perez
Abrakadabra
Ad Infinitum
Ada by Pablo S. Gomez (author) and Louie D. Celerio (artist)
Ada: Ang Nuno sa Punso by Pablo S. Gomez (author) and Rico Rival (artist)
Adonis Abril
Adonis, Obra Maestra ng Baliw
Adora by Tarhata Memije Directo (author) and Mar Amongo (artist)
Adriana
After Eden by Arnold Arre
Agatona by Carlo J. Caparas (author) and Mar T. Santana (artist)
Agilang Itim
Agimat ng Pusang Itim
Agua Bendita by Rod A. Santiago
Aguila Qualikomiks
Aguinaldong Banal
Ahastra  by Cil Evangelista (author) and Ruben Javier (artist)
Akda Komiks
Akin ang Huling Halakhak by Nerissa G. Cabral (author) and Joey D. Celerio (artist)
Akin ang Kasalanan
Akin Ka
Akin Ka…Ngayong Gabi! by Rico Bello Omagap (author) and Rudy V. Arubang (artist)
Aklat ng Kabayanihan: Graf Spee
Aklat ng Kabayanihan: Pearl Harbor by Alfredo P. Alcala
Aklat ng Kabayanihan: Prince of Wales by Alfredo P. Alcala
Aklat ng Kabayanihan: Warspite by Alfredo P. Alcala
Aklat ng Kabayanihan: Yamato
Ako ang Uusig
Ako ba ay Tao?
Ako Pa Rin Ang Hari by Steve Gan
Ako…Ang Iyong Panginoon
Ako…Si Jesse! by O.B. Pangilinan (author) and Mar T. Santana (artist)
Ako'ng Panginoon by O.B. Pangilinan (author) and Tony Caravana (artist)
Ako'y Ifugao…Pilipino by Carlo J. Caparas (author) and Rudy V. Villanueva (artist)
Ako'y Nauuhaw! by Mars Ravelo (author) and Elpidio E. Torres (artist)
Ako'y Tao –May Dugo at Laman! by Mars Ravelo (author) and Mar T. Santana (artist)
Aksiyon Komiks by Eriberto Tablan (author) and Alfredo Alcala and Virgilio Redondo (artists)
Alabok sa Ulap
Alakdang Bato
Alamat 101
Alamat Comics
Alamid by Tony Caravana
Ala-Suwerte
Album ng Kabalbalan ni Kenkoy by Romualdo Ramos (author) Tony Velasquez (artist)
Aldong Kuba by Joven N. Gapuz
Alex Bato by Pete San Felipe/Floren Perello (authors) and Edgar Bercasio (artist)
Ali Badbad en da Madyik Banig by R.R. Marcelino (author) and Cal Sobrepena (artist)
Ali Mudin by Clodualdo del Mundo (author) and F. Macabuhay (artist)
Alicia Alonzo by Mars Ravelo (author) and Elpidio E. Torres (artist)
Aling Kutsero by Virgilio Redondo (author) and Nestor Redondo (artist)
Aling Maria by Elena M. Patron (author) and Freddie Tolentino (artist)
Alinlangan
Alipin ng Busabos by Mars Ravelo (author) and P.Z. Marcelo (artist)
Aliwan Komiks
Almira
Alona by Emil Quizon Cruz
Always in my Heart
Alpha Omega Girl by Flor Afable Olazo (author) and Nar O. Castro (artist)
Alyas Agimat by Clodualdo del Mundo (author) and Jesse F. Santos (artist)
Alyas Baldo by Elena M. Patron (author) and Vir G. Flores (artist)
Alyas Buldoser
Alyas James Bond-Ying
Alyas Palos by Virgilio Redondo (author) and Nestor Redondo (artist)
Alyas Raquel Roma
Alyas Raton Ariel
Alyas Tigre
Amalia Darling! by Jim Fernandez
Amalia ng Quiapo by Tony Caravana
Amanda
Amor Encantado
Ampaw
Anak Mo…Ama'y Ako! by Greg Igna de Dios (author) and Mar T. Santana (artist)
Anak ng Aking Asawa
Anak ng Bakulaw by Virgo Villa (author) and Federico Perona (artist)
Anak ng Bulkan
Anak ng Demonyo by Pablo S. Gomez (author) and Louie D. Celerio (artist)
Anak ng Gangster by Ramon R. Marcelino (author) and Mar T. Santana (artist)
Anak ng Hudas
Anak ng Impakta
Anak ng Kidlat by Virgilio Redondo (author) and Nestor Redondo (artist)
Anak ng Lawin by Pablo S. Gomez (author) and Rico Rival (artist)
Anak ng Tampalasan
Anak ni Abraham by Benjie Valerio, Jr. (author) and Fabie Infante (artist)
Anak ni Dyesebel by Mars Ravelo (author) and Elpidio E. Torres (artist)
Anak ni Prinsipe Amante
Anak ni Zuma by Jim Fernandez (author) and Ben S. Maniclang (artist)
Anatalia by Rico Bello Omagap (author) and Antonio J. Ocampo (artist)
Ang 12 Pag-ibig ni Rizal
Ang Akin ay Akin at ang Iyo ay Akin pa Rin by Pablo S. Gomez (author) and Dannie Taverna (artist)
Ang Akin ay Para sa Lahat by Pablo S. Gomez (author) and Alex Nino (artist)
Ang Anak Ko'y Amerikana
Ang Anino sa Luksang Salamin
Ang Asong Itim sa Gulod
Ang Babaing Hinugot sa Aking Tadyang
Ang Babaing Nakapula by Elena M. Patron (author) and Louie D. Celerio (artist)
Ang Babaing Pusa
Ang Babaing Walang Kaluluwa
Ang Baliw sa Libingang Luma by Pablo S. Gomez (author) and Lan Medina (artist)
Ang Bangkay ni Senyor Hugo by Larry Tuazon (author) and Rod A. Santiago (artist)
Ang Barbaro by Francisco V. Coching
Ang Bilanggo sa Pulong Kristo
Ang Biyenan Kong Amerikana by Mars Ravelo (author) and P.Z. Marcelo (artist)
Ang Buhay na Bato sa Latian
Ang Buhay nga Naman by Lib Abrena
Ang Buhay ni Huwang Pahanga
Ang Bukas ay Akin! (Langit ang Uusig) by Nerissa G. Cabral (author) and Joe Mari Mongcal (artist)
Ang Bukas ay Walang Hanggan
Ang Daigdig ng Ada by Pablo S. Gomez (author) and Louie D. Celerio (artist)
Ang Daigdig ni Doktor Markus by Virgilio Redondo (author) and Alfredo P. Alcala (artist)
Ang Daya-Daya by Mars Ravelo (author) and Elpidio E. Torres (artist)
Ang Espadang Umaawit
Ang Gangster at ang Birhen by Ramon R. Marcelino (author) and Mar T. Santana (artist)
Ang Gina at si Aladino by Jess A. Noriega
Ang Halimaw sa Intramuros
Ang Hiwaga ng Rosas na Itim
Ang Huling Lalaki ng Baluarte by Carlo J. Caparas (author) and Nestor Malgapo/Karl Comendador (artists)
Ang Huling Romansa by Elena M. Patron (author) and Romy T. Gamboa (artist)
Ang Ikatlong Nilalang ng Diyos
Ang Inyong Lagalag na Reporter by O.B. Pangilinan (author) and Nes Ureta (artist)
Ang Kagila-gilalas na Pakikipagsapalaran ni Zsazsa Zaturnnah by Carlo Vergara
Ang Kalabog by Larry Alcala
Ang Kaluluwa ni Dante by Francisco V. Coching
Ang Kambal sa Uma by Jim Fernandez (author) and Ernie H. Santiago (artist)
Ang Kampana sa Santa Quiteria by Pablo S. Gomez (author) and Tony Caravana and Hal Santiago (artists)
Ang Kampanerang Kuba by Pablo S. Gomez (author) and Alex Nino (artist)
Ang Kasaysayan ng Eden
Ang Kasaysayan ni Josue
Ang Kasaysayan ni Judith
Ang Kasaysayan ni Ruth
Ang Kasaysayan ni Samuel
Ang Kastilyo sa Sapang Itim
Ang Kuba sa Palengke by Pablo S. Gomez (author) and Butch (artist)
Ang Langaw
Ang Lihim ni Gagamba by Virgilio Redondo (author) and Nestor Redondo (artist)
Ang Limbas at ang Lawin by Francisco V. Coching (author) and Federico Javinal (artist)
Ang Mababangis
Ang Maskara ni Palos by Virgilio Redondo (author) and Nestor Redondo (artist)
Ang Maton
Ang Mga Kasalanan ni Emmaruth by Ading Gonzales
Ang Mga Lawin by Virgilio Redondo (author) and Nestor Redondo (artist)
Ang Mga Pakikipagsapalaran ni Rondo
Ang Multo ni Carlota
Ang Multo sa Bahay-Pari
Ang Mundo ni Andong Agimat by Arnold Arre
Ang Nakangiting Bangkay
Ang Nobya Kong Igorota by Rico Bello Omagap (author) and Jim Fernandez (artist)
Ang Paa ni Isabella
Ang Pagano  by Francisco V. Coching (author) and Federico Javinal (artist)
Ang Pagbabalik ng Vampira
Ang Pagbabalik ni Darmo Adarna by R.R. Marcelino (author) and Rey Arcilla (artist)
Ang Paghihiganti ni Astrobal by Jim Fernandez (author) and H.A.N.D. (artist)
Ang Palasyo ng Mandaragat
Ang Pamana
Ang Panday by Carlo J. Caparas (author) and Steve Gan (artist)
Ang Pinasulabi
Ang Prinsesa at ang Alipin
Ang Sandok ni Boninay by Rod A. Santiago (author) and Joe Mari Mongcal (artist)
Ang Sawa sa Lumang Simboryo by Amado C. Yasona (author) and Tony de Zuniga/Hugo Yonzon (artists)
Ang Signo by Virgilio Redondo
Ang Tagisan ng mga Agimat
Ang Taong Halimaw sa mga Guho ng Intramuros
Ang Tatlong Kaluluwa ni Eba by Rey Leoncito (author) and Rey Macutay (artist)
Ang Testamento ni Don Gallardo
Ang Tigre at ang Diablo
Ang Tunay na Dugo't Laman
Ang Ulilang Anghel
Ang Utak
Angela
Angela Markado by Carlo J. Caparas (author) and Abe Ocampo (artist)
Angelito
Angelo
Anghel ng Demonyo
Anghel sa Impiyerno by Conrado G. Diaz (author) and Bert Lopez (artist)
Angkan ng Masasama
Angkan ni Zuma by Jim Fernandez (author) and Mar T. Santana (artist)
Anino ni Agila
Anino ni Bathala by Pablo S. Gomez (author) and Nestor Redondo (artist)
Anino ni Maria Kapra by Greg Igna de Dios (author) and Jun Marcos (artist)
Anting-Anting ni Dading by Amado S. Castrillo (author) and Alfredo P. Alcala (artist)
Apat na Agimat by Clodualdo del Mundo (author) and Fred Carrillo (artist)
Apat na Alas
Apat na Anino by Clodualdo del Mundo (author) and Fred Carrillo (artist)
Apat na Espada
Apat na Gantimpala
Apat na Halimaw by Deo Villegas (author) and Nar O. Castro (artist)
Apat na Mukha ni Eva
Apat na Taga
Apoy sa Eden
Apoy sa Magdamag
Ara
Aram by Joe Lad Santos (author) and Al Cabral (artist)
Araw-Araw Kitang Mahal by Manuel Ramirez (author) and Abe Ocampo (artist)
A.R.C.H.O.N. (Assistance Response Contingent & Hazard Overseer Network)
Armino
Asawang Binili
Asero by  Rod Santiago
Asintado by Clodualdo del Mundo (author) and Fred Carrillo (artist)
Aso ni San Roque
Astrobal by Jim M. Fernandez
Asuwang by Virgo Villa (author) and Felipe Ilag (artist)
Asyang ng La Loma by Clodualdo del Mundo (author) and Fred Carrillo (artist)
Asyong Aksaya (Wasteful Asyo) by Larry Alcala
At Naghintay si Reynosa…50 Taon
Atlanta by Rading Mina Sabater
Atomik Komiks by Alfredo Alcala
Atoz
Ay, Naku Neneng!
Ayokong Tumuntong sa Lupa

B
Bakas ng Gagamba by Virgilio Redondo and Nestor Redondo
Barako Komiks
Barok by Bert Sarile
Bata Batuta Komiks
Batch 72 by Budjette Tan and Arnold Arre (artist)
Bayan Knights
Bituin Komiks
Bondying by Mars Ravelo
Bulaklak Komiks

C
Captain Barbell by Mars Ravelo and Jim Fernandez (artist)
Caravana Klasics by Tony Caravana
Carpool by Syeri Baet
Combatron by Berlin Manalaysay
Continental Komiks 
CRAFT Klasix

D
Dalaga Komiks
Darna Komiks by Mars Ravelo
Diamante Komiks
Dolly and Lavinia Explore the Interverse by Trizha Ko
Dyesebel by Mars Ravelo and Elpidio Torres (artist)

E
Educational Klasiks
Elmer by Gerry Alanguilan
Enter the Brown Dragon by Jun Dayo
Espeyal Komiks by Tony Velasquez
Extra Komiks
Extra Special Komiks

F
Facifica Falayfay  by Mars Ravelo
Fiesta Komiks
Flash Bomba by Mars Ravelo

G
Gagamba by Virgilio Redondo and Nestor Redondo
Gwapo Komiks
Goyo by Mars Ravelo

H
Halakhak Komiks
Hiwaga Komiks by Tony Velasquez, Nestor Redondo and Alfredo Alcala
Holiday Komiks

I
Ikabod Bubwit by Nonoy Marcelo

J

K
Kalayaan by Gio Paredes
Kamay ni Hugo
Kambal na Talim by Karl Comendador
Kapit sa Patalim by Felix Villar and Mario Mijares Lopez (authors) and R. B. Clemente (artist)
Kapitan Tog by Freely Abrigo
Kenkoy Komiks
Kick Fighter Komiks
Kidlat Komiks
Kikomachine Komix by Manix Abrera
Kislap Komiks
Kubori Kikiam by Michael David
Kulafu Komiks by Pedrito Reyes (author) Francisco Reyes (artist)
Kwin by Ollie Roble Samaniego (author) and Zamora (artist)
Kyut Komiks

L
Lagim Komiks
Lapu-Lapu (Lapu-Lapu: The Untold Story by Oli Roble Samaniego; Lapu-Lapu by Francisco V. Coching; Lapu-Lapu by Pilipino Komiks)
Lastikman by Mars Ravelo
Libong Higit pa sa BUTONG PAKWAN by Jun R. de Leon (author) and R. Miralles (artist)
Ligaya Komiks
Liwayway Komiks
Lovelife Komiks

M
Maalaala Mo Kaya? Komiks
Mabuhay Komiks
Madyik Komiks
Maharlika Komiks
Manila Klasiks
Markang Agila by Carlo J. Caparas (author) and Joey Otacan (artist)
Marte Komiks
Maruja by Mars Ravelo
Maskarado by Reno Maniquis
Mga Anak ni Zuma by Jim Fernandez and Mar P. Servicio III (artist)
Mga Kwentong Barbero 83 by L.P.Calixto (author) and Ben. S. Maniclang (artist)
Mwahaha

N
Nardong Tae by Louie Cordero
Ninja Komiks

O
OFW Super Stories by Carlo J. Caparas
Oras Mo Na! by Rudy Fluoresce

P
Palos Komiks by Nestor Redondo and Virgilio Redondo
Pantastik Komiks
Paraluman Komiks
Pedro Penduko by Francisco V. Coching
Philippine Adventure & Romance Stories
Pilipino Komiks
Pilipino FUNNY Komiks
Pinoy Komiks
Pioneer Komiks
Planet Opdi Eyp by Ron Santiago
Prinsipe Amante by Clodualdo Del Mundo and Alfredo Alcala (artist)
Pugad Baboy by Apolonio "Pol" Medina, Jr.
Pupung by Washington "Tonton" Young
Puro Wakas Komiks

Q

R
Rambol Komiks by Gilbert Monsanto
Redondo Komix by Nestor Redondo
Redondo's Gagamba Komiks Magazine by Virgilio Redondo and Nestor Redondo
Rex Komiks
Romansa Komiks by Elena M. Patron and R.V. Villanueva (artist)
Romantic Klasiks

S
Sampaguita Komiks
Sanduguan Komiks by Gener Pedrina
Sapot ni Gagamba kasama si Scorpio
Sentensyador by Karl Comendador
Shocker Komiks
Si Janus Sílang at ang Tiyanak ng Tábon novel by Edgar Calabia Samar, adaptation by Carljoe Javier, illustrations by Natasha Ringor (Anino Comics/Adarna)
Si Janus Sílang at ang Labanang Manananggal-Mambabarang novel by Edgar Calabia Samar, adaptation by Mervin Malonzo (Anino Comics/Adarna)
Silangan Komiks
Simbilis ng Kidlat by Renato Mendoza and Leonardo Castro (artist)
Sixty Six by Russell Molina (writer) and Ian Sta. Maria (artist) (Anino Comics/Adarna)
Speed Komiks
Sugbo Jam
Super Action Pocket Komiks
Super Fantasy
Superyor Komiks by Nestor Redondo

T
Tabloid Komiks by Reno Maniquis
Tagalog Klasiks
Teens Weekly Komiks
The Cannibal by Jim Fernandez and by Hal Santiago (artist)
The Monkey and the Turtle is the very first known Philippine comics. It was written and illustrated by the national hero of the Philippines Dr. Jose Rizal in 1885 while he was on Paris.
The Mythology Class by Arnold Arre
Tiny Tony by Mars Ravelo and Jim Fernandez (artist)
Topak! Humor Magazine
Trese by Budjette Tan (author) and Kajo Baldisimo (artist)
Trip to Tagaytay by Arnold Arre
Tropa
True Experience Stories
True Ghost Stories
Tsampiyon Komiks
TSE (Teens Showbiz Entertainment) Tapusan Komiks

U
UFO Hunter
United Komiks by Pablo S. Gomez
Universal Komiks Magazine by Pablo S. Gomez

V
Varga by Mars Ravelo
Vista Komiks

W
Wang Ho by Rod A. Santiago (author) and Rudy F. Mesina (artist)
Wasted by Gerry Alanguilan

X

Y

Z
Zsazsa Zaturnnah sa Kalakhang Maynila by Carlo Vergara
Zuma Komiks by Jim Fernandez and Vicatan (artist)

See also 

 Philippine comics
 List of Filipino komik artists
 List of Filipino comics creators
 List of Filipino superheroes
 List of Filipino supervillains

External links 
 "Philippine Comics" The most comprehensive library of Filipino comics on the internet.
 Pinoy Superheroes Universe "An online compendium of Filipino comic book heroes from the 80'S, 90'S and beyond."
 International Catalogue of Superheroes
 Lambiek's Comiclopedia

References

Comic strips
Philippine comics titles

Comics titles by country
Titles
Philippines
Comic strips by country